Charles Courtice Alderton (June 21, 1857 – May 29, 1941) was an American pharmacist and the inventor of the carbonated soft drink Dr Pepper.

Early life
Charles Courtice Alderton was born June 21, 1857 in Brooklyn, New York, the eldest of five children to English parents.

Alderton attended Framlingham College in England, studied medicine at the University of Texas, and worked as a pharmacist in Waco, in a shop called "Morrison's Old Corner Drug Store", which had a soda fountain.

Creation of Dr Pepper
Alderton noticed that customers were tiring of the traditional flavors of sarsaparilla, lemon and vanilla, and so to try and revive sales, began experimenting with new flavor combinations, eventually settling on a 23 ingredient mix combined with phosphoric acid to give it tang. It was first sold on December 1, 1885, and was ordered by asking the soda attendant to "shoot a Waco".

Alderton gave the formula to the owner of Morrison's Old Corner Drug Store, Wade Morrison, who then named it Dr Pepper.

It was introduced to almost 20 million people while attending the 1904 World's Fair Exposition in St. Louis, Missouri as a new kind of soda pop. Its introduction in 1885 preceded the introduction of Coca-Cola by one year.

Completed in 1906, the Artesian Manufacturing and Bottling Company, located at 300 South Fifth Street in downtown Waco, Texas, was the first building to be built specifically to bottle Dr Pepper and Dr Pepper was bottled there until the 1960s. The building now houses the Dr Pepper Museum, which opened to the public in 1991. The museum has three floors of exhibits, a working old-fashioned soda fountain, and a gift store of Dr Pepper memorabilia.

Personal life
Alderton married twice in his life. His first wife was Lilian "Lillie" E. Walker, whom he married in October 1884. It was announced in the Galveston, Texas newspaper. They married at the residence of Lillie's father J. B. Walker. Lillie died in 1916. Alderton married Emilie Marie Coquille on December 20, 1918 in New Orleans, Orleans, Louisiana.

Death
Alderton died May 29, 1941. He was buried in Oakwood Cemetery, Waco, McLennan County, Texas, in Plot: Section B-1 Lot 425.

References 

1857 births
1941 deaths
American pharmacists
19th-century American inventors
People from Brooklyn
University of Texas Medical Branch alumni
American expatriates in the United Kingdom
Burials at Oakwood Cemetery (Waco, Texas)
American people of English descent
People educated at Framlingham College
Inventors from New York (state)